The Living Treasures of Hawaii program was created in 1976 by the Buddhist temple Honpa Hongwanji Mission of Hawaii to honor residents of Hawaii. It was inspired by the Living National Treasures of Japan award, and is awarded annually.

The criteria for selection are, "First, the designee must demonstrate continuous growth in his or her field; second, the potential Living Treasure must have made significant contributions toward a more humane and fraternal society (and this perhaps is the most important criteria); and finally, he or she must have shown an on-going striving for excellence and a high level of accomplishment." Honorees are nominated by members of the general public by August 1 of each year, and chosen by a committee designated by the temple.

These are the people who have been so honored.

1976
 Charles Kenn

1977
 Wright Elemakule Bowman, Sr.
 Jean Charlot
 Johanna Drew Cluney
 Samuel Hoyt Elbert
 Kenneth Pike Emory
 Iolani Luahine
 Rosalie Lokalia Lovelle Montgomery
 Mary Kawena Pukui

1978
 Theodore Kelsey

1979
 Abraham Kahikina Akaka
 Emma Kalani-kau'i-ka'alaneo-kilioulaninui-amamao-ho'opi'i-wahine-keakaleihilinaka deFries
 John Dominis Holt, IV
 Edward Leilani Kamae
 Edith Kekuhikuhi-i-pu'uone'ona'ali'i-o-kohala Kenao Kanaka'ole
 Clorinda Low Lucas
 Aldyth Vernon Morris
 Alice Kuʻuleialohapoʻinaʻole Kanakaoluna Nāmakelua
 Gabby Pahinui

1980
 Gabriel I
 Maxine Hong Kingston
 Donald Kilolani Mitchell
 Pilahi Paki
 Alfred Preis

1981
 Solomon Kekipi Bright, Sr.
 Oswald Bushnell
 Leo Ohai
 Leon J. Edel
 William H. Meinecke
 Isamu Noguchi
 Juliet Rice Wichman

1982
 Juliette May Fraser
 Annie Lehua Asam Kanahele
 Richard Lyman, Jr.
 Silver Kiniohi Piliwale
 James Ka'upena Wong, Jr.

1983
 Homer Ahu'ula Hayes
 Rubellite Kawena Kinney Johnson
 Zaneta Ho'oululahui Cambra Richards
 Morrnah Nalamaku Simeona
 Emily Kau'i Zuttermeister

1984
 Satoru Abe
 Bumpei Akaji
 Irmgard Farden Aluli
 Francis Haar
 Herb Kawainui Kane
 Tadashi Sato
 Emma Kapi'olani Farden Sharpe

1985
 Gladys Kamakakuokalani Ainoa Brandt 
 May Moir
 Sarah M. Wood Nalua'i
 Katashi Nose
 Soichi Sakamoto
 Allan Frederic Saunders

1986
 Claude F. DuTeil
 Edward L. Kealanahele
 Milton M. Howell
 Margaret Machado

1987
 Agnes C. Conrad
 Agnes Kalanihoʻokaha Cope
 Edmund M. K. Enomoto
 Joe Harper
 Claude Horan
 David Kuraoka
 John Keolamaka'ainanakalahuiokalani Lake
 Kahauanu Lake
 Toshiko Takaezu

1988
 Kenneth F. Brown
 David Kauweloa Kaupu
 Murray Turnbull

1989
 Reiko Mochinaga Brandon
 Healani Onohiaulani Chilton Doane
 Yehan Numata
 Reuben Tam
 Tseng Yu-ho (Betty Ecke)

1990
 Richard Kekuni Blaisdell
 Edmond Lee Browning
 Frances Damon Holt
 Kyo Kawabata

1991
 Daniel G. Chun
 Dwight Pauahi Kauahikaua
 Moses Kapalekilahao Keale, Sr.
 Puanani Kanemura Van Dorpe

1992
 Helen Hoakalei Kamau'u
 David Nu'uhiwa Enoka Kaohelauli'i
 Marie Emilia Leilehua McDonald
 Harry Seisho Nakasone
 Matsuno Yasui
 David Nu'uhiwa Enoka Kaohelauli'i

1993
 Elaine Arita
 Yoshiko Matsuda
 Stewart Valentine Medeiros, Sr.
 Edith Hanae Tanaka
 Shige Yamada

1994
 Todd Toshiaki Akita
 Daniel J. Dever
 Yoshiaki Fujitani
 Roy T. Fukumura
 Deborah Kepola Kekalia
 Yukio Ozaki
 Marion Grace Saunders

1995
 Donald Tai Loy Ho
 Sally Fletcher Murchison
 Leone Kamana Okamura

1996
 Wallace F. Froiseth
 Hiroki Morinoue
 Shinichi Suzuki

1997
 Robert Aitken
 Henry A. Auwae
 Martha Kaumakaokalani Aoe Poepoe Hohu
 Ralph Chikato Honda
 Iwao Mizuta

1998
 Hubert Victor Everly
 George Sanford Kanahele
 Beatrice Kapua'okalani Hilmer Krauss
 Jerry Okimoto
 Vladimir Ossipoff
 Ruth Tabrah

1999
 Earl E. Bakken
 Samuel S. A. Cooke
Shimeji Ryusaki Kanazawa
 Yutaka Kimura
 Abraham St. Chad Pi'ianai'a
 Adam A. "Bud" Smyser

2000
 Glenna Fusae Kimura Ewing
 James K. Fujikawa
 Ah Quon McElrath
 Rose Nakamura
 Charles Nainoa Thompson

2001
 Ronald E. Bright
 Sean Kekamakupa'a Lee Loy Browne
 Rocky Ka'iouliokahihikolo 'Ehu Jensen
 Bob Krauss
 Jesse "Takamiyama" Kuhaulua Azumazeki Oyakata
 Clarence K. M. Lee

2002
 Alfred Bloom
 Takeshi Fujita
 Takashi Nonaka
 Lynne Yoshiko Nakasone
 Yoshihiko Sinoto
 Myron "Pinky" Thompson

2003
 Beatrice "Beebe" Freitas
 Mary Lou Kekuewa
 Dr. Albert H. Miyasato
 Dr. Margaret Y. Oda
 Ted T. Tsukiyama
 Masaru "Pundy" Yokouchi

2004
 The Rev. Mitsuo Aoki
 Genoa Keawe
 Pat Namaka Bacon
Fujio Matsuda
 Edith Kawelohea McKinzie
 Tau Moe

2005
 Dr. Isabella Aiona Abbott
 Gabriel "Gabe" Baltazar Jr.
 Momi Cazimero
 Dr. Thomas Klobe
 Sione Tui'one Pulotu
 Dr. Benjamin B.C. Young

2006
 Richard K. Paglinawan
 James T. Kunichika
 Carol Kouchi Yotsuda
 Edward T. Kaanana "Uncle Eddie"
 Walter H. K. Paulo "Uncle Walter"
 Dr. Terry Shintani

2007
 Malia Craver
 George Na'ope
 Dr. Terence Rogers
 Norman Sakata
 Barbara Smith
 Dorothy "Aunty Dottie" Thompson
Wally Yonamine

2008
 Edwin Mahiai Beamer
 Dr. Charles P.K.M. Burrows
 Rev. Sam Cox
 Benjamin Kodama
 Elsie T. Tanaka

2009
 Amy Agbayani
 Puanani Sonoda Burgess
 Sister Joan Chatfield
 Bert N. Nishimura
 Nalani Olds

2010
 S. Stanley Okamoto
 Elizabeth Kawohiokalani Ellis Jenkins
 Paul Weissich
 Reverend Toshihide Numata
 Patti Lyons

2011
 Josephine Kaukali Fergerstrom
 Dr. Claire Ku’uleilani Hughes
 Masaru Oshiro
 Dr. Jack H. Scaff Jr., 
 Dr. Livingston M.F. Wong, MD, FACS

2012
 Barbara Kawakami
 Ben Finney
 Goro Arakawa
 Gordon Mark
 Lynette Paglinawan

2013
 Dennis Kauahi
 Nola A. Nahulu
 Michael Nakasone
 Oswald K. Stender
 Gary Washburn

2014 

 Ida Keliʻiokalani Chun
 Samuel ʻOhukaniʻohiʻa Gon III
 Robert Mitsuru Hamada
 Arthur & Rene Kimura
 Chikai Yosemori

2015 

 Haunani Apoliona
 Blossom Puanani Alama-Tom
 Laura Ruby
 Bernice Hirai
 Paulette Kahalepuna
 Barry Taniguchi

2016 

 Paul Leland Breese
 Sooriya Kumar
 Puakea M. Nogelmeier
 Dennis Masaaki Ogawa
 Lillian Noda Yajima

2017 

 Ryokan Ara
 Beatrice Kanahele Dawson
 Nobuko Kida
 Roy Sakuma
 George Yokoyama

2018 

 Mitchell Eli
 Mary Jo Freshley
 Hailama Farden
 Gordon Umialiloalahanauokalakaua Kai
 Takejiro Higa

2019 

 John M. Hara
 Earl Kawaa
 Gertrude Yukie Tsutsumi
 James "Jimmy" T. Yagi

2020 

 Robert Cazimero
 Larry Kimura
 Carolee Nishi
 Sachie Saigusa

2021 
Not awarded

2022 

 Kenny Endo
 Patrick Kirch
 Kealiʻi Reichel

References

Lists of people from Hawaii
People from Hawaii
Orders, decorations, and medals of Hawaii
1976 establishments in Hawaii
Awards established in 1976